Gala Gordon (born 26 March 1991) is an English actress and model.

Early life
Gala Gordon was born in Bryanston. Her mother, Patricia MacTaggart, is a London-based interior designer and her father, Xavier Botana, is an Argentinian artist who lives in Buenos Aires. Gala, named after Salvador Dalí's wife, chose her mother's maiden name as her surname. She attended Bryanston School, Dorset, and graduated in 2012 from London's Guildhall School of Music and Drama where she played lead roles in several stage productions such as The Seagull, Hamlet, Agamemnon and The Life and Adventures of Nicholas Nickleby.

Career

Acting
After graduation, Gordon made her professional stage debut in 2012, playing the lead role of Irina in Benedict Andrews’ production of Chekhov’s Three Sisters at the Young Vic starring opposite Vanessa Kirby.

In 2013 she filmed her first feature film Kids in Love about a group of modern bohemian friends. The main cast also includes Cara Delevingne and Alma Jodorowsky.
Also in 2013 she appeared in the Suede's "Hit Me" video clip, recorded in the Manchester Art Gallery.
She appeared with Matt Smith in music videos for two songs by Noel Gallagher's High Flying Birds: "We're on our way now" (May 2021) and "Flying on the ground" (June 2021).

Modelling
Gordon is represented by NEXT Model Management.

In 2014 Gordon featured in Roberto Cavalli Class line campaign fall Winter 2014/15. She's the face of Bella Freud's fragrance 1970, launched in 2014.

Personal life
Gordon lives in Notting Hill.

Filmography

Film and television

Stage

References

External links
 
 Gala Gordon profile at the Guildhall School

Living people
1991 births
21st-century English actresses
Actresses from London
Alumni of the Guildhall School of Music and Drama
British actors of Latin American descent
English film actresses
English people of Argentine descent
English stage actresses
People educated at Bryanston School